

Events

Works published
Sitot no m'es fort gaya la sazos by Bonifaci VI de Castellana, written at Montpellier, an attack on Charles of Anjou
Quascus planh le sieu damnatge, a planh of Raimon Gaucelm de Bezers for a bourgeois of Béziers named Guiraut de Linhan and the only such poem surviving for a middle-class figure
, a pastorela by Guiraut Riquier

Births
 Guan Daosheng (died 1319), Chinese poet and painter during the Yuan Dynasty
 U Tak (died 1342), Korea

Deaths

13th-century poetry
Poetry